Jesper Modig (born 6 September 1994) is a Swedish football defender who plays for Trelleborgs FF.

References

1994 births
Living people
Swedish footballers
Association football defenders
IF Limhamn Bunkeflo (men) players
Lunds BK players
Varbergs BoIS players
Ettan Fotboll players
Superettan players
Allsvenskan players
Swedish expatriate footballers
Expatriate footballers in Norway
Swedish expatriate sportspeople in Norway